is a Japanese footballer who plays as a striker for Jupiler Pro League club Cercle Brugge and the Japan national football team.

Youth career
Born in the city of Mito, located in the Ibaraki Prefecture, he began playing football at age 6 and was inspired by seeing his father score a hat-trick in a match. Ueda began his youth career with Kashima Antlers Norte whilst at junior high school and then moved on to play at Kashima Gakuen High School. He represented his high school in both the Inter High School Championship and the Japan High School Soccer Tournament – he scored two goals in the first round of the competition but the team were knocked out in the second round.

Hosei University
After graduating high school, Ueda then went on to study Sport Studies at Hosei University and he was part of the football team right from his first year. In his first year at Hosei, Ueda scored 15 goals in 27 games and won the JUFA Kanto League 1 Best Rookie award. In his second year, Ueda helped Hosei University win the All Japan University Football Championship for the first time in 42 years. He scored in the semi-final against Juntendo University and scored 2 goals in the tournament overall, where he was also selected as the Best Forward in the competition. In the 2018 JUFA Kanto League 1, he was also inducted into the season's Best XI after scoring 11 goals in 19 appearances.

After the success of his first two years at university, in February 2019 it was announced that he would be joining his boyhood club Kashima Antlers as a designated special player, with a view to join the club fully in 2021. He began the season back representing Hosei, but in July 2019 it was announced that he would be retiring from the university team and would be joining Kashima earlier than initially planned. His national team call up accelerated his departure from the university team and provided him with an opportunity to take the next step – Ueda saying "I have done what I can do in Hosei".

Club career
He made his debut for Kashima Antlers in July 2019, coming on as a late substitute for Shoma Doi in a 1-1 league draw with Urawa Red Diamonds. He scored his first professional goal the following month, in a 2-1 league victory over Yokohama F. Marinos. On his first start for the club in September, he scored two goals in a 4-0 league win against Shimizu S-Pulse. He ended his debut season with 4 league goals in less than 400 minutes. Ueda also made his first appearances in a continental competition, appearing in both games against Guangzhou F.C. in the quarter final of the 2019 AFC Champions League.

After a successful debut season, Ueda continued to make an impression in the 2020 season scoring 10 goals in 29 appearances across all competitions – made even more impressive by the fact he only played the full 90 minutes in two games all season.

In the 2021 season, Ueda's goals were vital to Kashima's top 4 finish. In 29 league games, he scored 14 goals making him Kashima's top goalscorer for the season and the fourth highest goalscorer in the league. This was in spite of him missing almost two months of football after suffering a groin strain in June. His performances did not go unrewarded and was named one of the 31 Outstanding J.League players as voted for by managers and players, although he did not make it into the eventual overall Best XI.

In 2022, he scored a brace against Gamba Osaka in what was Kashima's first official match of the season. Since then, he improved his goalscoring status, finishing as the 2022 J1 League topscorer in June, having scored 10 goals in 18 matches. In his already outstanding previous year, he needed 21 matches to score his 10 goals. And in 2022, he only needed 16 matches to match this goal tally. He also won Moriyasu's trust, and was frequently called up for the national team, having participated in 5 out of the 6 matches the national team played in from March to June. After this improvement in club performances, alongside more game-time with the national team, reportedly caught some overseas interest. On 1 July 2022, he was unveiled as Cercle Brugge new signing, joining the club in a complete transfer. After passing the medical check, he signed a 4-season contract, lasting to June 2026.

International career

Youth career
In November 2017 whilst still at Hosei University, Ueda received his first national team call up to represent the U-20 team at the friendly M-150 Cup competition. He made his first appearance as a substitute in a 2–1 defeat to Thailand, but scored twice on his first start in a 4–0 win over North Korea. Japan played Uzbekistan in the final where Ueda played the whole game which ended in a 2–2 draw and was decided on penalties. Ueda missed Japan's final penalty in the shootout to hand the tournament victory to Uzbekistan.

In June 2018, Ueda was part of the Japan U-21 squad to play in the prestigious Toulon Tournament. Used as a substitute in the first two group games against Turkey and Portugal, he made a big impact in the latter scoring two goals as Japan won 3–2.

Ueda was also part of the silver medal-winning squad from the 2018 Asian Games squad in August. He appeared in six out of Japan's seven games during the tournament, including playing the full 120 minutes against South Korea in their extra time win in the gold medal match. Ueda scored three goals in the tournament, firstly a penalty in Japan's 1-0 Round of 16 win against Malaysia, then in the 1-0 semi-final win over the United Arab Emirates, with the final goal coming during extra time of the gold medal match.

Ueda also took part in the U-23 Dubai Cup for Japan U-21s in November 2018. He ended up as top scorer in the tournament, scoring a hat-trick in a 5–0 win over Kuwait and the equalising goal in a 1–1 draw with United Arab Emirates. Japan finished in second place in the tournament and Ueda was named most valuable player.

In 2019, Ueda continued to play for the U-23 squad, this time in the AFC U-23 Championship qualifiers. Japan cruised through their qualifying group, scoring 21 goals and conceding none. He scored a hat-trick in a 8–0 win over Macau and scored another in a 6–0 win over Timor-Leste. In the main competition, Japan were surprisingly knocked out at the group stage, with Ueda not able to make an impact in either of the games he appeared in.

In July 2019, Ueda was part of the Japan team to take part in the biannual Summer Universiade. He scored two goals in the first game of the competition in a 3–0 victory over Argentina. After seeing off South Korea in the quarter finals and beating Italy on penalties in the semi-final, Japan ended up winning the competition after a 4–1 victory over Brazil in the gold medal match including a hat-trick from Ueda.

In June 2021, Ueda was named in Japan's squad to play at the delayed 2020 Summer Olympic Games. He went on to make an appearance at every game during the tournament, including 90 minutes in a 4–0 win over France, and culminated in Japan finishing fourth after losing the bronze medal match 3–1 to Mexico.

Senior career
After showing a high goalscoring form for Japan's youth teams, on 24 May 2019, Ueda was called up by Japan's head coach Hajime Moriyasu to feature in the Copa América played in Brazil. At the time of his call-up, he was still playing for his university team, the first time a university player was called up since Kensuke Nagai and Kazuya Yamamura were selected in 2010. He made his debut on 17 June 2019 in a 4–0 defeat against Chile, as a starter. He went on to make two more appearances as a substitute in the competition, before Japan were knocked out at the group stage with Ueda missing some big chances throughout.

Despite his performances at Copa América, Moriyasu once again named Ueda in the Japan squad, this time for the 2019 EAFF E-1 Football Championship. He appeared in all three of Japan's games and played his first full 90 minutes in a senior international in a 2–1 victory over China PR. Japan finished runners-up in the tournament after a 1–0 defeat to South Korea in the final.

In November 2022, Ueda was called up to Japan's squad for the 2022 World Cup. He made his World Cup debut when starting in Japan's second group game against Costa Rica, however Ueda struggled to make an impact on the game and was substituted at half-time for Takuma Asano. Japan went on to lose the game 1–0 to a late Costa Rica winner. This was Ueda's first and last appearance at the 2022 World Cup as he was then unused for the rest of the tournament, as Japan got knocked out in the Round of 16 by eventual semi-finalists Croatia.

Career statistics

Notes

National team statistics

References

External links

1998 births
Living people
Hosei University alumni
Association football people from Ibaraki Prefecture
Japanese footballers
Japan international footballers
J1 League players
Belgian Pro League players
Kashima Antlers players
Cercle Brugge K.S.V. players
Association football forwards
Japanese expatriate footballers
Expatriate footballers in Belgium
Japanese expatriate sportspeople in Belgium
2019 Copa América players
Medalists at the 2018 Asian Games
Footballers at the 2018 Asian Games
Asian Games medalists in football
Asian Games silver medalists for Japan
Universiade medalists in football
Universiade gold medalists for Japan
Medalists at the 2019 Summer Universiade
Footballers at the 2020 Summer Olympics
Olympic footballers of Japan
2022 FIFA World Cup players